The 2018–19 Argentine Torneo Federal A, is the 6th season of the third tier of the Argentine football league system. The tournament is reserved for teams indirectly affiliated to the Asociación del Fútbol Argentino (AFA), while teams affiliated to AFA  have to play the Primera B Metropolitana, which is the other third tier competition. The champion is promoted to Primera B Nacional. 36 teams are competing in the league, 29 returning from the 2017–18 season, 3 teams that were relegated from Primera B Nacional and 4 teams promoted from Federal B. The regular season began on September 8, 2018 and will end in June 2019.

Format

First stage
The teams were divided into four zones with nine teams (a total of 36 teams) in each zone and it was played in a round-robin tournament whereby each team played each one of the other teams two times. The teams placed 1st to 4th from each zone qualified for the Second Stage. The remaining twenty three teams qualify for the Revalida Stage.

Championship stages

Second stage
The teams were divided into two zones with eight teams each and it was played in a round-robin tournament whereby each team played each one of the other teams one time. The teams first and second place and the best third place team from the two zones qualified for the Third Stage or Pentagonal Final. The remaining third place team qualify for the Third Phase of the Revalida Stage. The other ten teams qualify for the Second Phase of the Revalida Stage.

Third stage
The five teams that qualified for the third stage or Pentagonal Final play in a round-robin tournament whereby each team played each one of the other teams one time. The winner was declared champion and automatically promoted to the Primera B Nacional. The other four teams qualify for the Fourth Phase of the Revalida Stage.

Revalida Stages
The Revalida Stage is divided in several phases: First, the twenty teams that did not qualify for the Championship Stages were divided into the same four zones of the First Stage and it was played in a round-robin tournament whereby each team played each one of the other teams two times. The first place team of each zone qualified for the Second Phase. The second phase is played between the four teams that qualified from the First Phase and the ten teams that qualified from the Second Stage of the Championship Stage. The seven winners qualify for the Third Phase.
The Third Phase is played between the seven teams that qualified from the Second Phase and the team that qualified from the Second Stage of the Championship Stage. The four winners qualify for the Fourth Phase.

The Fourth Phase is played between the four teams that qualified from the Third Phase and the four teams that qualified from the Third Stage of the Championship Stage. The four winners qualify for the Fifth Phase. The Fifth and Sixth Phase is played between the remaining teams and aims to get the Second promotion to the Primera B Nacional.

Relegation
After the First Phase of the Revalida Stage a table was drawn up with the average of points obtained in the First Stage and the First Phase of the Revalida Stage. It is determined by dividing the points by the number of games played and the bottom team of each four zones was relegated to the Torneo Regional Federal Amateur. Following the Revalida Stage, another table was drawn up with the remaining teams that played the Revalida Stage and the bottom four teams were relegated to the Torneo Regional Federal Amateur, giving a total of eight teams relegated.

Club information

Zone A

1 Play their home games at Estadio José María Minella.

Zone B

Zone C

Zone D

First stage

Zone A

Results

Zone B

Results

Zone C

Results

Zone D

Results

Championship Stage

Second stage

Zone A

Results

Zone B

Results

Ranking of third-placed teams

Third stage

Results

Reválida Stage

First phase

Zone A

Results

Zone B

Results

Zone C

Results

Zone D

Results

Second phase

|-

|-

|-

|-

|-

|-

|-

Third phase

|-

|-

|-

|-

Fourth to Sixth phase

Fourth phase

|-

|-

|-

|-

Fifth phase

|-

|-

Sixth phase

|-

Relegation

Zone A

Zone B

Zone C

Zone D

General table

Relegation Triangular
All matches were played in Córdoba.

Results

Season statistics

Top scorers

See also
 2018–19 Argentine Primera División
 2019 Copa de la Superliga
 2018–19 Primera B Nacional
 2018–19 Primera B Metropolitana
 2018–19 Copa Argentina

References

External links
 Sitio Oficial de AFA   
 Ascenso del Interior  
 Interior Futbolero 
 Solo Ascenso  
 Mundo Ascenso  
 Promiedos  

Torneo Federal A seasons
3